Dus Numbri is a 1976 Indian Hindi-language film. Produced and directed by Madan Mohla, and written by S. Ali Raza and Dhruva Chatterjee, it stars Manoj Kumar, Hema Malini, Pran, Premnath, Bindu, Kamini Kaushal and Om Shivpuri. The music is by Laxmikant Pyarelal.  The film was later remade into the Telugu film KD No:1 (1978).

The film was the top hit of 1976.  The film ranked #9 for the 1970s decade and is also ranked #47 of all-time hits

Plot
Inspector Shiv Nath is an honest and diligent police officer in Bombay, and lives with his wife, Radha, and a young son, Arjun. While making several arrests in connection with counterfeit money and drugs, he discovers that his close friend, Karamchand is also involved in this racket. Before he could take any action, he himself is arrested by the police for possession of counterfeit money and drugs, and sentenced to a jail term, but he escapes. Radha loses her mind and is institutionalized, while Arjun takes to petty crime and on reaching adulthood is the Don of the area known and feared as "Dus Numbri". He meets with and falls in love with a petty thief and card-sharp, Rosemary Fernandes. When Radha accidentally meets with Rosemary, she thinks it is Sundari, Karamchand's wife, and then Radha starts to regain her sanity. But not for long, as Arjun, Radha, and Rosemary become enmeshed in a dangerous plot.

Cast
 Manoj Kumar ... Arjun
 Hema Malini ... Sundari / Rosemary Fernandes / Anupamaa
 Prem Nath  ... Inspector Jaichan
 Pran ... Hawaldar Karan Singh Badshah / CBI Officer Karan Singh
 Bindu ... CBI Officer Roopa Sharma / Dilruba Dilli Wali
 Kamini Kaushal ... Radha
 Om Shivpuri ... Karamchand
 David Abraham ... Pascal (as David)
 Sajjan 		
 Abhi Bhattacharya ... Insp. Shiv Nath
 Shyam Kumar 			
 Ram Mohan ... Police Inspector
 Shivraj ... Psychiatrist
 Kumud Tripathi 			
 Rajan Haksar ... Jhangi
 Madhup Sharma 		
 Dev Kishan 			
 Hercules 			
 Rajan Kapoor 		
 V. Gopal 		
 Azad 		
 Pahelwan ... (as Pehlwan)
 C.S. Dubey 		
 Kamaldeep 	 		
 Keshav Rana 			
 Kamal 		
 Rajni Bala ... Dancer (Mujhe dard lagta...) (as Rajnibala)
 Raju Shrestha ... (as Master Raju)
 Imtiaz Khan ... Veeru (as Imtiaz)
 Kuljeet ... Truck-driver (Veeru's partner)
 Usha Thakur

Soundtrack

Notes

References

External links 
 

1976 films
1970s Hindi-language films
Counterfeit money in film
Films scored by Laxmikant–Pyarelal
Hindi films remade in other languages